The Battle of Camden (August 16, 1780), also known as the Battle of Camden Court House, was a major victory for the British in the Southern theater of the American Revolutionary War. On August 16, 1780, British forces under Lieutenant General Charles, Lord Cornwallis routed the numerically superior U.S. forces led by Major General Horatio Gates about four miles north of Camden, South Carolina, thus strengthening the British hold on the Carolinas following the capture of Charleston.

The rout was a personally humiliating defeat for Gates, the U.S. general best known for commanding the American forces at the British defeat at Saratoga three years previously. His army had possessed a great numerical superiority over the British force, having twice the personnel, but his command of them was seen as disorganized and chaotic. Following the battle, he was regarded with disdain by his colleagues and he never held a field command again.  His political connections, however, helped him avoid any military inquiries or courts martial into the debacle.

Background
Following the British defeat at Saratoga in 1777, and the Battle of Monmouth in 1778, the French entered the American Revolutionary War in June 1778, followed by the Spanish in June 1779.  With the war at a stalemate in the north, the British decided to renew their "southern strategy" to win back their rebellious North American colonies.  The strategy relied on the Loyalists joining forces with British regulars to roll northward through North Carolina and Virginia, besieging the rebels in the north on all sides.  This campaign repeated the successful December 1778 Capture of Savannah, with Sir Henry Clinton's successful Siege of Charleston in May 1780.  British forces then campaigned in the Back Country, capturing the key towns of Georgetown, Cheraw, Camden, Ninety Six, and Augusta.  Clinton returned to New York on 5 June, after the southern remnants of the Continental Army were defeated in May at the Battle of Waxhaws, tasking Lord Cornwallis with the pacification of the remaining portions of the state.

The Patriot resistance remaining in South Carolina consisted of militia under commanders such as Thomas Sumter, William Davie, and Francis Marion.  Washington sent Continental Army regiments south, consisting of the Maryland Line and Delaware Line, under the temporary command of Major General Jean, Baron de Kalb.  Departing New Jersey on 16 April, they arrived at the Buffalo Ford on the Deep River, 30 miles south of Greensboro, in July.  Horatio Gates, the "Hero of Saratoga" arrived in camp on 25 July, to take command.  Two days later, Gates ordered his army to take the direct road to Camden, against the advice of his officers, including Otho Holland Williams.  Williams noted the country they were marching through "was by nature barren, abounding with sandy plains, intersected by swamps, and very thinly inhabited," and what few inhabitants they might come across were most likely hostile.  All of the troops had been short of food since arrival at the Deep River.

On 7 August, Gates was joined by 2,100 North Carolina militiamen under the command of General Richard Caswell.  At Rugeley's Mill, 15 miles north of Camden, 700 Virginia Militia under the command of General Edward Stevens joined Gates' "Grand Army".  In addition, Gates had Armand's Legion.  However, at this stage, Gates no longer had the help of Marion's or Sumter's men, and in fact had sent 400 of his Continentals to help Sumter with a planned attack on a British supply convoy.  Gates also refused the help of Col. William Washington's cavalry.  Apparently Gates planned on building defensive works 5.5 miles north of Camden in an effort to force British abandonment of that important town.  Gates told his aide Thomas Pinckney he had no intention of attacking the British with an army consisting mostly of militia.

Camden was garrisoned by about 1,000 men under Lord Rawdon.  General Cornwallis, alerted to Gates' movement on August 9, marched from Charleston with reinforcements, arriving at Camden on August 13, increasing the effective British troop strength to 2,239 men.

Gates ordered a night march to commence at 10:00 p.m. on 15th Aug., despite his army of 3,052, of which two-thirds were militia, having never maneuvered together.  Unfortunately, their evening meal acted as a purgative while they marched, with Armand's horse in the lead.  On a collision course was Cornwallis' army, also on a 10:00 p.m. night march, with Tarleton's dragoons in the lead.  A short period of confusion ensued when the two forces collided around 2:00 a.m., but both sides soon separated, not wanting a night battle.

Deployments

Gates formed up before first light. On his right flank he placed Mordecai Gist's 2nd Maryland Brigade (three regiments) and the Delaware Regiment, with Baron de Kalb in overall command of the right wing. On his left flank, he placed Caswell's 1,800 North Carolina militia; to the left of them were Stevens' 700 Virginians, and behind the Virginians were 120 men of Armand's Legion. Gates and staff stayed behind the reserve force, Smallwood's 1st Maryland Regiment, about 200 yards behind the battle line. Thus, the total number of Continentals on the field numbered 900. Gates placed seven guns along the line, manned by about 100 men. Also present, but whose disposition was unknown, were 70 mounted volunteer South Carolinians. Gates' formation, though a typical British practice of the time, placed his weakest troops against the most experienced British regiments, while his best troops would face only the weaker elements of the British forces.

Cornwallis had roughly 2,239 men, including Loyalist militia and Volunteers of Ireland. Cornwallis also had the infamous and highly experienced Tarleton's Legion, who were formidable in a pursuit situation. Cornwallis formed his army into two brigades. On the right was Lt. Col James Webster, facing the inexperienced militia with the 23rd Royal Welch Fusiliers and the 33rd Regiment of Foot. Lord Rawdon was in command of the left, facing the Continental Infantry with the Irish Volunteers, Banastre Tarleton's infantry and the Loyalist troops. In reserve, Cornwallis had two battalions of the 71st Regiment of Foot and Tarleton's cavalry force. He also placed four guns in the British center. As Gates had done, Cornwallis placed his more experienced units on the right flank, and his less experienced units on the left flank.

Battle

Gates ordered Stevens and de Kalb to attack, while Cornwallis issued the same order to Webster. The 800 strong 33rd Fusiliers advanced with bayonets towards the 2,500 soldiers in the Virginia and North Carolina militia. The militia, however, had never used bayonets before. The American left wing collapsed as the Virginians and then the North Carolinians fled. The Virginians fled so fast that they suffered only three wounded. The North Carolinians fled all the way back to Hillsborough, North Carolina.

According to Williams, referring to the British charge, "the impetuosity with which they advanced, firing and huzzaing, threw the whole body of militia into such a panic that they generally threw down their loaded arms and fled in the utmost consternation. The unworthy example of the Virginians was almost instantly followed by the North Carolinians."

Furthermore, in a letter to Thomas Jefferson, then governor of Virginia, "picture it as bad as you possibly can and it will not be as bad as it really is."

A member of the North Carolina militia, Garret Watts, later confessed, "It was instantaneous. There was no effort to rally, no encouragement to fight. Officers and men joined in the flight. I threw away my gun..."

Rawdon's troops advanced in two charges, but heavy fire repulsed his regiments. The Continental troops then launched a counterattack which came close to breaking Rawdon's line, which began to falter. Cornwallis rode to his left flank and steadied Rawdon's men. Instead of pursuing the fleeing militia, Webster wheeled to the left, into the Continentals. One of the North Carolina militia brigades that had been stationed next to the Delaware Line held its ground, the only militia unit to do so.

De Kalb called up the reserve 1st Maryland Brigade to support the 2nd, but they could get no closer than several hundred feet. However, as Lt. Col. Benjamin Ford of the 6th Maryland Regiment stated to Williams' entreaties, "We are outnumbered and outflanked. See the enemy charge with bayonets." With the British closing in on three sides, Cornwallis ordered Tarleton's cavalry to charge into the rear of the Continental line. The cavalry charge broke up the formation of the Continental troops, who finally broke and fled. However, Gist was able to move 100 Continentals in good order through a swamp, where the cavalry could not follow. Additionally, about 50 to 60 Maryland Line Continentals, under the leadership of Maj. Archibald Anderson, Lt. Col. John Eager Howard, and Capt. Robert Kirkwood, were able to retreat in good order.

According to Tarleton, "rout and slaughter ensued in every quarter."

De Kalb, attempting to rally his men, was unhorsed, and would die of his numerous wounds (11 in total; 8 by bayonet and 3 by musket balls) two days later as a British prisoner. After just one hour of combat, the American troops had been utterly defeated, suffering over 2,000 casualties. Tarleton's cavalry pursued and harried the retreating Continental troops for some  before drawing rein.

According to Charles Stedman, one of Cornwallis' officers. "The road for some miles was strewn with the wounded and killed who had been overtaken by the legion in their pursuit. The numbers of dead horses, broken wagons, and baggage scattered on the road formed a perfect scene of horror and confusion: Arms, knapsacks, and accoutrements found were innumerable; such was the terror and dismay of the Americans."

Casualties
The British casualties were 69 killed, 245 wounded and 11 missing.
Hugh Rankin says, "of the known dead, 162 were Continentals, 12 were South Carolina militiamen, 3 were Virginia militiamen and 63 were North Carolina militiamen". David Ramsay says, "290 American wounded prisoners were carried into Camden after this action. Of this number, 206 were Continentals, 82 were North Carolina militia and 2 were Virginia militia. The resistance made by each corps may in some degree be estimated from the number of wounded. The Americans lost the whole of their artillery - 8 field pieces, upwards of 200 wagons and the greatest part of their baggage." A letter from Cornwallis to Lord George Germain, dated 21 August 1780, says that his army took "about one thousand Prisoners, many of whom wounded" on August 18.
The website Documentary History of the Battle of Camden, 16 August 1780 details on its Officer Casualties at Camden page the fates of 48 Continental officers at Camden: 5 were killed, 4 died of wounds, 4 were wounded without being captured, 11 were wounded and captured and 24 were captured without being wounded. These ratios would suggest that many of the Americans wounded in the battle escaped capture.

Analysis
There are many reasons given for Gates' defeat. The most prominent are the following:

Tactical evaluation
Gates, as a former British officer, was accustomed to the traditional British deployment of the most experienced regiments on the place of honor: the right flank of the battle line. Gates had therefore placed the Continental regiments on his right flank, and the mass of militia which had joined him—of whom nearly all of the Virginians had never been in a battle—on the left flank, facing the most experienced British regiments.  Gates was also too far behind his troops to observe the battle or see what the British were doing.  Tarleton claims Gates made four errors, including not taking a stronger position on Saunders' Creek before Cornwallis arrived, moving his army at night, the placement of his militia, and the adjustment of his disposition just before battle.

Strategic evaluation
Aside from tactics on the battlefield, Gates had made several strategic errors before joining the battle:
 His aggressive movement brought his forces deep into pro-British territory, where residents still loyal to the Crown would provide no supplies, nor join his army.
 So far from their supply lines, Gates' forces were weakened by lack of adequate food, many of them falling victim to diarrhea.
 Gates took great confidence in his victory at Saratoga but erred in mapping the inexperience of Burgoyne (his opponent in that battle) onto Cornwallis, who was a gifted strategist.

Aftermath

Gates proceeded onwards to Hillsborough, a distance of 180 miles, where he arrived on the 19th and then composed his report to Congress on 20 Aug.  The report to the President of the Continental Congress, Samuel Huntington, began, "In deepest Distress and Anxiety of Mind, I am obliged to acquaint your Excellency with the Total Defeat of the Troops under my Command."  In a 30 Aug. letter to George Washington, Gates wrote, But if being unfortunate is solely a Reason sufficient for removing me from Command I shall most cheerfully submit to the Orders of Congress; and resign an office few Generals would be anxious to possess..."

Gates lost control of the southern army.  However, Daniel Morgan and Nathanael Greene defended Gates' actions, but not his decision to fight. Major General Greene, George Washington's original preference, was subsequently given command of the southern army.

Legacy
Approximately 479 acres of the core of the battlefield is owned by the Palmetto Conservation Foundation, and is undergoing preservation in private-public partnership. The original five acres were owned by the Hobkirk Chapter of the Daughters of the American Revolution who gave their portion over to the current owners. The site was declared a National Historic Landmark in 1961, and placed on the National Register of Historic Places in 1966.

Aspects of the battle were included in the 2000 movie The Patriot, in which Ben and Gabriel Martin are seen watching a similar battle. Ben comments at the stupidity of Gates fighting "muzzle to muzzle with Redcoats". The film is not historically accurate, depicting too many Continental troops relative to the number of militia, and showing the Continentals and militia retreating at the same time.

Order of battle

British and Loyalists
The British and loyalist order of battle was as follows:

Overall Command: Lt. Gen. Lord Cornwallis

Right Brigade:

Commanding Officer: Lt. Col. James Webster
23rd Regiment of Foot
33rd Regiment of Foot
2 guns

Left Brigade:

Commanding Officer: Col. Lord Rawdon
2nd American Regiment
Infantry, British Legion
Loyalist Militia:
John Hamilton's Royal North Carolina Regiment
Morgan Bryan's North Carolina Volunteers
2 guns

Reserves:

71st Regiment of Foot: Lt. Col. Alexander McDonald
Dragoons, British Legion: Lt. Col. Banastre Tarleton

Patriots
The Patriots' order of battle consisted of 4,100 soldiers:

Overall Command: Maj. Gen. Horatio Gates

Right Flank:

Commanding Officer: Brig. Gen. Mordecai Gist
2nd Maryland Regiment
1st Delaware Regiment
3 guns

Center:

Commanding Officer: Brig. Gen. Richard Caswell
North Carolina state militia (Hillsborough District Brigade, Salisbury District Brigade, Edenton District Brigade, Halifax District Brigade, New Bern District Brigade, Wilmington District Brigade
2 guns

Left Flank:

Commanding Officer: Brig. Gen. Edward Stevens
Virginia Militia
Armand's Legion

Reserve:

Commanding Officer: Brig. Gen. William Smallwood
1st Maryland Regiment
2 guns

See also
 American Revolutionary War § War in the South. Places ' Battle of Camden ' in overall sequence and strategic context.

Notes

References
Boatner, Mark Mayo, Cassell's Biographical Dictionary of the American War of Independence, 1763-1783, Cassell and Company Ltd., London, 1966. 
Buchanan, John, The Road to Guilford Courthouse: The Revolution In The Carolinas.1997, John Wiley and Sons, 
Ramsay, David, The History of the American Revolution, Liberty Fund, Indianapolis, 1990 (first published 1789), Volume II

Russell, David Lee The American Revolution in the Southern Colonies 2000.
Ward, Christopher War of the Revolution 2 Volumes,  MacMillan, New York, 1952

External links

Battle Commemoration website - Includes a listing of American and British participants and casualties
Portrait of Baron DeKalb
Portrait of John Edgar Howard 
Portrait of William Smallwood 
Portrait of William Washington 
Portrait of Otho Williams
History Animation of Battle of Camden 
220 Broad Street - Historic Camden / Cornwallis House - Kershaw County at Roots & Recall

1780 in the United States
Conflicts in 1780
Camden
Camden
Camden
Kershaw County, South Carolina
Camden
1780 in South Carolina
Camden order of battle